'Granoturris padolina'' is a species of sea snail, a marine gastropod mollusk in the family Mangeliidae.

Description
The length of the shell varies between 5 mm and 9 mm.

Distribution
This species occurs in the Caribbean Sea off Colombia; also off Southern Brazil (Estado de Santa Catarina)

Fossils have been found in Quaternary strata of Florida, USA.

References

External links
 
  Tucker, J.K. 2004 Catalog of recent and fossil turrids (Mollusca: Gastropoda). Zootaxa 682:1–1295.
 Agudo-Padrón, A. Ignacio. "Inventario sistemático revisado y actualizado de los moluscos marinos ocurrentes en el Estado de Santa Catarina, Brasil." Revista Brasileira de Gestão Ambiental e Sustentabilidade 2.2 (2015): 59–75

padolina
Gastropods described in 1953